Indian bay leaf is a common name for several plants with leaves used in cooking and may refer to:

 Cinnamomum tamala, also known by the common name tejpatta
 Syzygium polyanthum, also known as Indonesian bay leaf